Nathan Kanya (born October 17, 1984 is a professional Canadian football linebacker who is currently retired. After finishing his CIS career with the UBC Thunderbirds in Vancouver BC, he signed as an undrafted free agent with the Hamilton Tiger-Cats on March 2, 2011.

Nathan was acquired by the Edmonton Eskimos via a trade deal with the Hamilton Ticats on February 5, 2013 

Following the 2015 CFL season, Kanya was re-signed by the Saskatchewan Roughriders for the 2016 season. Terms of the contract were not disclosed. Nathan retired in June 2016.

References

External links
Edmonton Eskimos bio

1987 births
Living people
Canadian football linebackers
Edmonton Elks players
Hamilton Tiger-Cats players
UBC Thunderbirds football players
Saskatchewan Roughriders players